Sunningdale is a suburb of Johannesburg, South Africa. It is located in Region E and Ward 72 of the City of Johannesburg Metropolitan Municipality.

References 

Johannesburg Region E